Dragon's Lair is a video game franchise created by Rick Dyer and Don Bluth. The series is famous for its Western animation-style graphics and complex decades-long history of being ported to many platforms and being remade into television and comic book series.

The first game in the series is titled Dragon's Lair, originally released for arcades in 1983 by Cinematronics. It uses laserdisc technology, offering greatly superior graphics compared to other video games at the time. The game was ported to several other platforms, but as no home system technology of that era could accommodate the graphical quality of LaserDisc, several abridged versions of the original game were released under different names. The first true sequel, Dragon's Lair II: Time Warp, had started development as early as 1984, but would only appear in arcades in 1991. While its graphics were once again praised, its now outdated and limited interactivity compared to the newer generation of arcade games kept it from reaching the popularity of the original.

The two main games in the series are considered gaming classics and are frequently re-released for each new generation of consoles. In 2010, they were bundled alongside the unrelated 1984 Bluth Group game Space Ace in the Dragon's Lair Trilogy which was made available across numerous platforms.

Forays into other media include a short lived animated series that aired on ABC in 1984 and a comic-book miniseries released in 2003. Plans for a feature-length film have existed since the 1980s and resurfaced in 2015, when Bluth launched two crowd-funding campaigns. The Kickstarter campaign was unsuccessful but the Indiegogo campaign reached its target in early 2016.

Games 
 Dragon's Lair is a laserdisc video game published by Cinematronics in 1983. In the game, the protagonist Dirk the Daring is a knight attempting to rescue Princess Daphne from the evil dragon Singe who has locked the princess in the foul wizard Mordroc's castle. It featured animation by ex-Disney animator Don Bluth. Most other games of the era represented the character as a sprite, which consisted of a series of pixels displayed in succession. Due to hardware limitations of the era, artists were greatly restricted in the detail they could achieve using that technique; the resolution, framerate, and number of frames were severely constrained. Dragon's Lair overcame those limitations by tapping into the vast storage potential of the LaserDisc but imposed other limitations on the actual gameplay. The game can freeze as the laserdisc searches for the correct scene to play, and the cabinets are difficult to maintain. It was advertised as the first truly 3D video game and as the meeting point of video games and animated films. Its success sparked numerous home ports, sequels, and related games. In the 21st century, it has been repackaged in a number of formats (such as for the iPhone) as a "retro" or historic game. It is currently one of only three video games (along with Pong and Pac-Man) in storage at the Smithsonian Institution in Washington, D.C.
 Escape from Singe's Castle, also known as Dragon's Lair Part II - Escape from Singe's Castle, is a 1987 video game published by Software Projects for the Amstrad CPC, Commodore 64, and ZX Spectrum home computers. In 1990 and 1991, Readysoft made the Amiga, Atari ST, and PC versions; based on the latter, an Apple IIGS version was released in 2022. The game is sometimes referred to as Dragon's Lair II but is not the official arcade sequel Dragon's Lair II: Time Warp.
 Dragon's Lair is a 1990 platform game developed by MotiveTime and published by CSG Imagesoft in North America, Elite Systems in Europe and Epic/Sony Records in Japan for the Nintendo Entertainment System. Its plot is identical to that of the original game.
 Dragon's Lair: The Legend is a 1991 platform game developed by Elite Systems and published by CSG Imagesoft in North America, Elite Software in Europe and Epic/Sony Records in Japan for the Game Boy. This is actually a port of Elite's 1985 ZX Spectrum game Roller Coaster.
 Dragon's Lair II: Time Warp is the first official sequel other than Escape from Singe's Castle. Released in 1991 by Leland Corporation, its story takes place years later. Dirk has married Daphne, and the marriage has produced several children. When Daphne is kidnapped by the evil wizard Mordroc in order to be forced into marriage, Dirk's children are clearly upset by the abduction of their mother, and Dirk must once again save her. Home ports of the game were announced for the Philips CD-i, 3DO Interactive Multiplayer, and Jaguar CD. However, only the CD-i version was actually released, though non-playable demos of the 3DO and Jaguar CD versions appear on those consoles' respective versions of Brain Dead 13. The game was later ported to the Wii as part of the compilation release Dragon's Lair Trilogy.
 Dragon's Lair III: The Curse of Mordread was made for Amiga, Atari ST, and PC in 1993, mixing original footage with scenes from Time Warp that were not included in the original PC release due to memory constraints. The game also included a newly produced "Blackbeard the Pirate" stage that was originally intended to be in the arcade game but was never completed.
 Dragon's Lair is a 1993 platform game developed by MotiveTime and published by Data East in North America, Elite Systems in Europe and Konami in Japan for the Super Nintendo Entertainment System. Its plot is identical to that of the original game.
 Dragon's Lair 3D: Return to the Lair was developed in 2002, as a 3D interpretation of the game developed by Dragonstone Software and published by Ubisoft for Microsoft Windows, Xbox, GameCube and the PlayStation 2. It is based on the original Dragon's Lair and follows a similar story as Dirk must enter Mordroc's castle to rescue Princess Daphne from a dragon. Many of the characters and locations from the 1983 original make appearances in the game, along with new puzzles, rooms, and enemies. The game uses cel shading to mimic the distinctive style of the original. Bluth produced two new animated sequences for the opening and ending of the game. It received mixed reviews. In 2005, Digital Leisure created a new Dragon's Lair III which utilizes 3D footage from Dragon's Lair 3D but has a control system like the original arcade games.

Dragon's Lair led to the creation of 1984's Space Ace, another game animated by Don Bluth and his crew. Space Ace is a ROM and disc upgrade kit for the Dragon's Lair cabinets, complete with new control panel overlay, side art, and header.

Gameplay 
Players have five controls: up, down, left, right, and attack. Gameplay consists of reacting to on-screen button prompts which trigger pre-drawn success or failure animations, essentially a forerunner of the modern quick time event. A perfect run with no deaths lasts no more than 12 minutes. In total, the game has 22 minutes or 50,000 frames of animated footage, including individual death scenes and game over screens.

Characters

Dirk the Daring 
Dirk the Daring is the main protagonist of the first game and subsequent franchise. As a knight of the kingdom, Dirk was entrusted with the rescue of Princess Daphne from Mordroc and Singe because all other knights were killed. He becomes heir to the throne upon saving Princess Daphne; following her rescue, Dirk and Daphne are married. In both games, Dirk is voiced by sound editor Dan Molina. Retro Gamer included Dirk on their list of top 50 game characters in the category "Top Ten Forces of Good" and called him "without a doubt, the epitome of the heroic knight".

Princess Daphne 

In the games, Princess Daphne is the beautiful daughter of King Aethelred and an unnamed queen. She serves as the series' damsel in distress, a beautiful maiden coveted by many princes and knights, her heart belongs to the kingdom's champion, Dirk the Daring.

Adaptations 
The game led to the creation of a short-lived television cartoon series, Dragon's Lair by Ruby-Spears Productions, where Dirk the Daring is voiced by Bob Sarlatte and the unseen storyteller that narrates each episode is voiced by Clive Revill. Changes in the TV series include the originally nameless Dragon being given the name Singe (voiced by Arthur Burghardt), Princess Daphne (voiced by Ellen Gerstell) wears a long pink dress, and includes some exclusive characters like Princess Daphne's father King Ethelred (voiced by Fred Travalena), Dirk the Daring's horse Bertram (vocal effects provided by Peter Cullen), Dirk the Daring's squire Timothy (voiced by Michael Mish), and Dirk the Daring's rival Sir Hubert Blunt (voiced by Peter Cullen). Enemies include the Lizard King, the Phantom Knight, the Giddy Goons, and the Mudmen. Thirteen half-hour episodes were produced and aired on the ABC network from September 8, 1984, to April 27, 1985. It was last aired on the USA Cartoon Express between the late '80s and the early '90s. To keep the show in the spirit of the game, before each commercial break the storyteller asks what the viewer would do to solve the problem facing Dirk. After the commercial break, the outcomes of the various choices are shown before Dirk acts on the correct idea (with the occasional exception) to save the day. Don Bluth had no involvement in the TV series.

A comic book miniseries based on the game, but incorporating elements from the cartoon series as well, like Dirk's horse Bertram, was released in 2003 by CrossGen, concurrent with a miniseries based on Space Ace. Arcana Studio published the entire comic book series in 2006, as there are three issues that were previously unpublished.

Film 
In the 1980s, a film version of Dragon's Lair was planned, with Alan Dean Foster involved in shaping the story. The project fell apart due to low interest from other studios.

In 2015 and 2016, Bluth and Goldman crowdfunded  for a 10-minute teaser for an animated feature-length Dragon's Lair prequel film, their first feature film since Titan A.E. Bluth and Goldman have announced that the film will provide more backstory for Dirk and Daphne and that Daphne will show that she is not a "blonde airhead".

In March 2020, the film was approved by Netflix after one year of negotiations. Ryan Reynolds was in talks for the lead role. Reynolds, Roy Lee, Trevor Engelson, Bluth, Goldman, and former Bluth collaborator John Pomeroy are producers, with Dan and Kevin Hageman as writers. However, as of now, no updates have been given for the film.

References

External links 
 Digital Leisure, License Holder of Dragon's Lair
 Dragon's Lair at MobyGames
 Dragon’s Lair at Classicgaming.cc
 

 
Video game franchises
Interactive movie video games by series
Fantasy video games
LaserDisc video games
Video game franchises introduced in 1983
Video games adapted into comics
Video games adapted into television shows